Anvar is a given name and surname. The name comes from Arabic and means "light", like the variant Anwar. Notable persons with the name Anvar include:

Persons with the given name
Anvar Berdiev (born 1978), Uzbek footballer
Anvar Bikzhanov (born 1951), Russian football coach
Anvar Gafurov (born 1982), Uzbek footballer
Anvar Gazimagomedov (born 1988), Russian footballer
Anvar Ibragimgadzhiyev (born 1991), Russian footballer
Anvar Ibragimov (born 1965), Soviet fencer
Anvar Juraboev (1948–2010), Uzbek journalist, historian and politician
Anvar Mammadkhanli (1913–1990), writer and screenwriter, script writer, translator and art worker
Anvar Chingizoglu (born 1962, Azerbaijani historian, ethnologist and genealogist
Anvar Rajabov (born 1988), Uzbek footballer
Anvar Sadat (1918–1981), President of Egypt, serving 1970 to 1981
Anvar Saidenov (born 1960), Kazakh national bank chairman
Anvar Soliev (born 1978), Uzbek footballer
Anvar-qori Tursunov, Uzbek imam
Anvar Yunusov (born 1987), Tajik boxer

Persons with the surname
Cas Anvar, Canadian actor, voice actor, and writer
Hassan Anvar, Chinese-Uyghur refugee wrongly imprisoned in Guantanamo Bay detention camp 
Qasem-e Anvar (1356–1433), Sufi mystic, poet, and a leading da'i (preacher) of the Safavid order

See also
Khvajeh Anvar, a village in Donbaleh Rud-e Shomali Rural District, Dehdez District, Izeh County, Khuzestan Province, Iran
Ənvər Məmmədxanlı, Azerbaijan, a village and municipality in the Ujar Rayon of Azerbaijan
Andvar, a village in Chelav Rural District, in the Central District of Amol County, Mazandaran Province, Iran
Anvard, the moatless castle where King Lune of Archenland resides in the fictional land of Narnia
Anvari (1126–1189), Persian poet
Anvari (surname)
Avar (disambiguation)
Anwar (disambiguation)